Tawfik Abu al-Huda (also known as Tawfik Pasha Abul-Huda) (1894 – 1 July 1956) served several terms as the 7th Prime Minister of Jordan. First he served as Prime minister of Transjordan from September 28, 1938, to October 15, 1944, and he served another term from December 28, 1947, to April 12, 1950. Between July 25, 1951, and May 5, 1953, and from May 4, 1954, to May 30, 1955, he served as Prime Minister of Jordan. During his last term as Prime Minister, he tried to consolidate the power of King Hussein by holding parliamentary elections which many accused of being fraudulent.
His terms are notable for the 1948 Arab-Israeli War, during which Transjordan conquered the West Bank, and the forced abdication of King Talal.

He served as the President of the Senate of Jordan from 1947 to 1951.

Tawfik Abu al-Huda was of Palestinian descent. He was married to the sister of the Ottoman banker in Amman.

In office 
Abul al-Huda formed 12 governments during his service as a prime minister which lasted beyond the entire era of World War II in the Middle East.

Death 
Tawfik Pasha was found dead, hanging in bathroom at his house in 1956 in an apparent suicide after bouts of an illness.

See also 
 List of prime ministers of Jordan

References

External links 
 Prime Ministry of Jordan website

Huda, Tawfik Abu
Huda, Tawfik Abu
Presidents of the Senate of Jordan
Foreign ministers of Jordan
Politicians who committed suicide
Abu al-Huda
Suicides by hanging in Jordan
Jordanian people of Palestinian descent
Huda, Tawfik
People from Acre, Israel